Peter Del Vecho (born April 6, 1958) is a film producer at Walt Disney Animation Studios, where he is also senior vice president of production. He is best known for producing Frozen and Frozen II together with directors Chris Buck and Jennifer Lee; the former won the Academy Award for Best Animated Feature.

Early life
Del Vecho grew up in the city of Quincy, in the South Shore area just outside Boston, Massachusetts.   He graduated from Boston University College of Fine Arts, where he studied theater production, and worked in theatre for many years.   After working at the Guthrie Theater in Minneapolis for about 7 years, he was recruited by Disney Animation. He started out in production management and transitioned into producing.

Career
Besides Frozen and its sequel, Frozen II, Del Vecho produced the Disney Animation films The Princess and the Frog (2009) and Winnie the Pooh (2011), and was an associate producer on Treasure Planet (2002) and Chicken Little (2005).

In Spring 2015, Del Vecho produced Frozen Fever, a short film based on Frozen which was again co-directed by Buck and Lee.  Del Vecho next produced the sequel to Frozen, Frozen II, which was released in November 2019 and again co-directed by Buck and Lee. Del Vecho later co-produced Raya and the Last Dragon with Osnat Shurer and is co-producing the upcoming Wish, which is scheduled for release in 2023, with Juan Pablo Reyes.

References

External links

American animated film producers
American film producers
Walt Disney Animation Studios people
Living people
Producers who won the Best Animated Feature Academy Award
1958 births